The Public Committee Against Torture in Israel (PCATI) is an Israeli NGO established in 1990 that monitors the use of torture and ill-treatment by Israeli security services against Palestinians under detention. PCATI was founded in 1990 in reaction to what it describes as "the ongoing policy of the Israeli government, which permitted the systematic use of torture and ill treatment in Shin Bet interrogations".

Approach 
PCATI monitors detention centers and advocates against the use of torture in interrogation in Israel using legal means, supporting relevant legislation and an information campaign aimed at raising public awareness of the subject. PCATI cooperates with other human rights organizations, Israeli, Palestinian and international, in its struggle against the use of torture in Israel and for the implementation of international law and international humanitarian law in Israeli law and practice.

PCATI is also engaged in outreach and education programs aimed at raising and engaging public discourse and consciousness regarding torture, impunity and related violations of human rights.

In December 1996, PCATI, together with the Palestinian Center for Human Rights (PCHR), Gaza, received the 1996 French Republic Award on Human Rights from the President of France.

Operation
PCATI acts on behalf of all people—Israelis, Palestinians, labor immigrants and other foreigners residing in Israel and the Occupied Palestinian Territories—with the aim of protecting them from torture and ill-treatment by the Israeli security authorities.

PCATI won a historic victory when, on 6 September 1999, in response to petitions of principle PCATI began submitting to the Israeli Supreme Court in 1991, and petitions filed together with the Association for Civil Rights in Israel, Hamoked–Center for the Defense of the Individual and others, the Supreme Court prohibited the use of various means of torture that were systematically employed by the Shin Bet until then. Following the decision, there was a significant decrease in the number of complaints regarding torture or the use of the harsh methods previously used.

However, following the onset of the Second Intifada in September 2000, there was, again, a sharp increase in the number of complaints of torture and ill treatment indicating a reversion to the methods prohibited by the Supreme Court. This resulted from the exploitation of "necessity defense" opening allowed by the Court in its ruling, or by altogether denying the fact that physical force was used in interrogation, which victims would find difficult to challenge. There was also a widening of the phenomenon of the ill treatment of Palestinian detainees by soldiers and other members of the security forces.

In light of this, PCATI expanded its activities and began employing field workers and external attorneys to assist the in-house staff in the investigation and treatment of cases of torture or cruel, inhuman or degrading treatment (CIDT). PCATI has, in addition continued to search for additional ways to combat torture, CIDT and related violations of human rights and particularly the issue of impunity, and to develop its legal and public advocacy methodology.

PCATI hopes in this way to influence policy makers, professionals and their associations, and the general public with the intent of converting such influence to pressure for policy change.

In 2009, PCATI released a report titled "Shackling as a Form of Torture and Abuse" that accused Israel of torturing hundreds of Palestinian prisoners by shackling them in violation of international standards. The report also called into question Israel's refusal to allow the Red Cross to inspect Facility 1391, a secret prison which has been called Israel's "Guantanamo Bay".

On 20 September 2016, NGO Monitor called out the inability of PCATI to base some of their allegations, such as the 2013 claim that Israel placed Palestinian children (and adults) in iron cages. Since then, several news networks circulated this claim, including The Independent and mondoweiss.

On 10 June 2022, PCATI said it was referring 17 cases to the International Criminal Court having concluded that obtaining justice within the Israeli system was impossible.

See also
 Al-Haq
 Palestinian Centre for Human Rights

References

External links
Official website

Human rights organizations based in Israel